Stade Yvan Georges is a stadium in Virton, Belgium. It is used for football matches and is the home ground of Excelsior Virton.  The stadium holds 4,015 spectators.

References 
Stade Yvan Georges, Excelsior Virton

Football venues in Wallonia
Sports venues in Luxembourg (Belgium)
R.E. Virton